The Remo flounder, Oncopterus darwinii, is an edible flatfish of the family Pleuronectidae. Its native habitat is the southwestern Atlantic along the southeast coast of South America, from Santa Catarina, Brazil in the north to the San Matías Gulf, Argentina in the south. It can reach  in length.

Identification
The Remo flounder is a righteyed flounder and so has both its eyes on the right-hand side of its body. Its upper surface is pale brown in colour with small white spots, and large white spots at its edges. The lateral line is marked by a distinctive semi-circular curve above the pectoral fin.

References

Pleuronectidae
Fish of the Atlantic Ocean
Southeastern South American coastal fauna
Fish described in 1874